Grevillea bracteosa, also known as bracted grevillea, is a species of flowering plant in the family Proteaceae and is endemic to the south-west of Western Australia. It is an erect to spreading shrub usually with linear leaves, and oval to more or less spherical clusters of glabrous pale green to greenish-pink flowers with a pink or white style.

Description
Grevillea bracteosa is an erect to spreading shrub that typically grows to a height of
 but does not form a lignotuber.

Taxonomy
Grevillea bracteosa was first formally described in 1848 by Carl Meissner in Johann Georg Christian Lehmann's Plantae Preissianae from specimens collected in the Swan River Colony by James Drummond. The specific epithet (bracteosa) means "having many or large bracts".

In 2008, Peter M. Olde and Neil R. Marriott described two subspecies in the journal Nuytsia and the names are accepted by the Australian Plant Census:

Distribution and habitat
Bracted grevillea grows in shrubland and sometimes heath and is found from near Geraldton to near Mogumber in the Avon Wheatbelt, Geraldton Sandplains and Jarrah Forest biogeographic regions of south-western Western Australia.

Conservation status
Both subspecies of G. bracteosa are listed as "Threatened Flora (Declared Rare Flora — Extant)" by the Department of Biodiversity, Conservation and Attractions.

Use in horticulture
This species of grevillea will grow in a wide range of well-drained soils and is frost and dought tolerant once established.

References

bracteosa
Endemic flora of Western Australia
Eudicots of Western Australia
Proteales of Australia
Taxa named by Carl Meissner
Plants described in 1848